Coxixola is the smallest municipality located in Paraíba state, Brazil. The population is 1,935 people (2020). The total area is 113.6 km². Coxixola was a district firstly of São João do Cariri-PB and after of Serra Branca-PB until 1994 when it became a municipality itself.

The word coxixola means to build a small house using clay bricks in Tupi-Guarany Indian language.

References

External links

Municipalities in Paraíba